The Professional Women's Bowling Association (PWBA) organizes and oversees a series of annual tournaments for the top competitive women ten-pin bowlers. The series is often referred to as the "women's tour" of bowling.

The PWBA was formed in 1960 but ceased operations in 2003. The PWBA Tour was re-launched in 2015 by the United States Bowling Congress (USBC) and Bowling Proprietors’ Association of America (BPAA) with a three-year funding commitment. In addition, through a new partnership with the Professional Bowlers Association (PBA), the PBA began conducting PWBA Regional (women-only) events and PWBA members are now allowed to bowl all PBA events.

History

The PWBA was formed in 1960 by a group of professional women bowlers. After the organization struggled, some of the players left the PWBA in 1974 to form the Ladies' Professional Bowlers Association (LPBA). The two merged again in 1978, forming the Women's Professional Bowlers Association (WPBA). When the WPBA dissolved in 1981, bowling center proprietor John Summer of Rockford, Illinois, started the Ladies Pro Bowlers Tour (LPBT), a private company, to continue the women's tour. The LPBT adopted the PWBA name and a new logo in 1998. In the fall of 2003, the PWBA Tour ceased operations before the completion of its 2003 season, primarily due to dwindling interest in sponsoring women's bowling.

The Women's International Bowling Congress (WIBC) then acquired the rights and assets of the PWBA. This gave the WIBC control of the PWBA name, trademark, logo, website domain (pwba.com), as well as the PWBA's historical records. The United States Bowling Congress (USBC) acquired the PWBA when the WIBC merged with the American Bowling Congress (ABC), Young American Bowling Alliance (YABA) and USA Bowling in 2005.

Without a PWBA Tour, women either retired from professional bowling, competed in the remaining women-only tournaments in the United States, or moved on to other bowling tournaments outside of the United States. Wendy Macpherson started competing in the Japan Professional Bowling Association (JPBA) in 2004, going on to earn ten JPBA titles. In 2007, the Japan Bowling Congress (JBC) started the DHC Cup Girls Bowling International - at the time the third largest women's tournament in the world in prize money, just behind the U.S. Women's Open and the USBC Queens.

Some women chose to bowl in professional men's tournaments. The Professional Bowlers Association (PBA) opened its membership to women in April 2004. PWBA members such as Kim Adler, Carolyn Dorin-Ballard, Liz Johnson, and Kelly Kulick became members of the PBA, with Kulick becoming the first female to earn an exemption on the PBA Tour (2005–06 season).

Women have had limited success in PBA events. Missy Parkin was the first female PBA member and now holds three PBA Regional Titles. Johnson was the first woman to make a televised appearance on the PBA Tour, finishing runner-up to Tommy Jones at the 2005 PBA Banquet Open. Kulick became the first woman to win a national PBA tournament major with her defeat of Chris Barnes in the 2010 Tournament of Champions. Johnson became the second woman to win a national PBA tournament with her defeat of Anthony Pepe in the PBA Chameleon Championship at the 2017 World Series of Bowling.

The USBC sponsored the PBA Women's Series starting with the 2007–08 season, allowing women PBA members to compete in a small number of events without their male counterparts. The final head-to-head match for that week's women's tournament would air in the same telecast as the PBA men's final round. The PBA Women's Series was discontinued after the 2009–10 season.

The PBA created the PBA Women's Regional Tour program in 2014, in which women bowl with and against their male counterparts, but there are specific prizes and benefits for women only.

In the media before 2015
Many PWBA events were nationally televised on the TVS Television Network (as the Ladies Pro Bowlers Tour) under a five year contract in the 1980s. When TVS could not maintain payments, it worked with Tom Ficara of the Cable Sports Network to continue coverage. After that agreement expired, Ficara acquired the TVS Network but did not renew the LPBT deal. LPBT final rounds were then televised on ESPN and ESPN2 from the late 1980s up until 2003, when the association folded. From 2004-2006, the WIBC Queens event (renamed USBC Queens in 2005) was the only scheduled event for female bowlers that received TV coverage.

For the autumn of 2007, the USBC acquired rights to the U.S. Women's Open. The event was televised for five Sundays on ESPN, with the action being called by PBA legends Nelson Burton Jr. and Marshall Holman. This event also served as the qualifier for the PBA Women's Series, a special four-stop mini-tour for the top 16 females. The finals for the mini-tour events were televised along with the regular PBA broadcasts for four Sundays on ESPN in November–December, 2007.

The U.S. Women's Open returned for five weeks in September–October, 2008. The PBA Women's Series was expanded to eight events in the 2008-09 and 2009-10 seasons but was then discontinued.

Season-by-season breakdown

2015 PWBA rebirth

The PWBA Tour returned from a 12-year hiatus in 2015, thanks to a three-year funding commitment from the United States Bowling Congress (USBC) and Bowling Proprietors’ Association of America (BPAA). The 2015 tour had ten stops (seven standard tournaments and three majors), running from May 13 to September 13.

2016 season

The PWBA Tour expanded to 13 events in 2016, with one additional major (GoBowling.com PWBA Players Championship).  CBS Sports Network aired the final round of all PWBA Tour events this season on a tape-delay basis, except for majors which aired the final round live.

2017 season

The 2017 PWBA Tour retains the format of 2016, with nine standard tournaments and four majors.  CBS Sports Network aired the final round of all PWBA Tour events this season on a tape-delay basis, except for majors which aired the final round live or same-day delay.

2018 season

Although the three-year funding commitment from the USBC and BPAA ended with the 2017 season, the PWBA announced in 2017 a 2018 season with two enhancements. The final three standard events are replaced with "elite format" events in which the top 24 players on the 2018 PWBA points list after eight events will earn automatic spots, and the remaining eight spots will be filled through an on-site eight-game qualifier each week, for a total field of 32 players. More significantly, the finals of each of the 13 events will take place in the same center where the event's other play took place, with the finals of the standard format events live-streamed, and the finals of the elite format events and majors televised live on CBS Sports Network.

2019 season

The 2019 season continued the enhancements started in 2018 and added one event, for a total of 14 events.

2021 season

The 2020 PWBA Tour season was cancelled due to the COVID-19 pandemic.

The 2021 PWBA Tour season features 20 title events (the most since 2001), plus a non-title made-for-TV event hosted by the PBA Tour called King of the Lanes: Empress Edition.

Notable members of the PWBA Tour

Donna Adamek 
Kim Adler 
Josie Barnes (Ernest)
Lynda Barnes (Norry)
Leanne Barrette 
Lisa Bishop 
Alayne Blomenberg  
Cindy Coburn-Carroll 
Stephanie Chiera
Patty Costello 
Cheryl Daniels 
Dede Davidson 
Marianne Dirupo 
Carolyn Dorin-Ballard 
Cathy Dorin-Lizzi 
Anne Marie Duggan 
Helen Duval 
Jeri Edwards 
Karen Ellingsworth 
Michelle Feldman 
Rene Fleming 
Kendra Gaines 
Julie Gardner 
Shirley Garms 
Carol Gianotti 
Nikki Gianulias 
Tennelle Grijalva-Milligan 
Clara Guerrero
Liz Johnson 
Tish Johnson 
Cara Honeychurch 
Shirley Hintz
Kelly Kulick 
Karen Krejcha
Wendy Macpherson
Danielle McEwan
Dana Miller-Mackie 
Debbie McMullen 
Patricia Lucci Mercatanti
Betty Morris
Michelle Mullen 
Jeanne (Maiden) Naccarato 
Sue Neidig 
Lori Nichols 
Carol Norman 
Virginia Norton 
Shannon O'Keefe
Missy Parkin (Bellinder)
Shannon Pluhowsky
Sandy Postma 
Stacy Rider 
Jan Schmidt 
Robin Romeo
Tori Romeo 
Jackie Sellers 
Sandra Jo Shiery 
Aleta Sill 
Michelle Silver
Linda Kelly
Judy Soutar 
Diana Teeters 
Kim Terrell-Kearney
Tammy Turner 
Lisa Wagner 
Leila Wagner
Stephanie Zavala

References

External links 
Official website of the Professional Women's Bowling Association
Official website of the Professional Bowlers Association
Women's professional bowling champions and awards 1949-present

Bowling organizations